In mathematics, the Itô isometry, named after Kiyoshi Itô, is a crucial fact about Itô stochastic integrals. One of its main applications is to enable the computation of variances for random variables that are given as Itô integrals.

Let  denote the canonical real-valued Wiener process defined up to time , and let  be a stochastic process that is adapted to the natural filtration  of the Wiener process. Then

where  denotes expectation with respect to classical Wiener measure. 

In other words, the Itô integral, as a function from the space  of square-integrable adapted processes to the space  of square-integrable random variables, is an isometry of normed vector spaces with respect to the norms induced by the inner products

and

As a consequence, the Itô integral respects these inner products as well, i.e. we can write

References 
 

Stochastic calculus